This is the discography of singer/songwriter Jonathan Coulton.

Studio albums

Live albums

Compilations

Singles

Other releases
 The Aftermath - Unreleased studio recordings, produced between Thing a Week and Artificial Heart.
 Unplugged - Live on Second Life, bootleg of online concert.
 Other Experiments - Rarities collection, contains unreleased songs and demos.
 "Still Alive" written for the video game, Portal. Vocals by Ellen McLain. Later re-recorded for Artificial Heart.
 "Want You Gone" written for the video game, Portal 2. Vocals by Ellen McLain. 
 "You Wouldn't Know" written for the video game, Lego Dimensions. Vocals by Ellen McLain. 
 "Redshirts", written for the book of the same name by John Scalzi.
 "GlaDOS Song" written originally for the video game, Portal 2 as an Easter Egg but was cut during production. It was later released on his Soundcloud Account. Vocals by Ellen McLain. 
 "The Princess Who Saved Herself" included on Many Hands for Haiti benefit compilation.

References

Folk music discographies
Rock music discographies
Discographies of American artists